For Fuck's Sake is the eighth studio album by British band The Nightingales. The album was a limited edition self-release and was
recorded in September 2013 at the Faust Studio, Scheer, Germany.

Track listing 
 "Bullet For Gove"
 "Diary Of A Bag Of Nerves"
 "The Gruesome Threesome"
 "Toasted On Both"
 "The Abstract Dad"
 "Good Morning And Goodbye"
 "His Family Has Been Informed"
 "Dumb And Drummer"
 "Thick And Thin"
 "Contempt"
 "Same Old"
 "Good Morning Midnight"

Personnel 
 Robert Lloyd – Vocals
 Alan Apperley – Guitars
 Fliss Kitson – Drums
 Andreas Schmid - Bass

Reception 
Joe Shooman of Record Collector awarded the album 4/5 and wrote "... as the title indicates, the band are in no mood to mess around. The result is that ace lyrics, riffs and ideas burst out from all angles". Hayley Scott rated it 7/10 for Line of Best Fit and wrote "Its allure is not immediately perceptible – it takes time to win you over, but it withstands repeated listens; its appeal never waning but heightening with perseverance".  In Mojo it was given 4/5 and described  as "Heartening evidence of the British art of mentally transforming ennui and chagrin into something approaching gold".

References

External links 
 Official artist website

2014 albums
The Nightingales albums
Alternative rock albums by British artists